S. A. "Jingle" Dissanayake(16 September 1913 - 11 March 1982) was a former Sri Lankan Inspector-General of Police. He played a major role as Deputy Inspector-General of Police of the Criminal Investigation Department in stopping the attempted military coup of 1962. Later in 1971 during the 1971 JVP Insurrection he was appointed as Additional Secretary of the Ministry of External Affairs and Defence and coordinated military and police operations that crushed the insurrection in two months.

Education
Educated at the Royal College Colombo where he played rugby union at the Bradby Shield Encounter, he went on to study at the University College, Colombo

Police career
In January 1938, he was appointed by the Governor as a Police Probationer and under went training at Hendon Police College. Having completed his service examinations, he was appointed Assistant Superintendent of Police, Galle in January 1940 and went on to serve in Tangalle, Galle, Colombo Division (North), Nuwara Eliya, Kurunegala, CID (Technical) and Ports. In January 1950 he was promoted to Superintendent of Police and went on duty leave to Australia. In 1925 he took over as Superintendent of Police Western Province (North). During police serviced he received the Ceylon Police Medal for Meritorious Service, Defence Medal 1939-45, Ceylon Police Independence Medal and the Service Medal of the Order of St John.

In 1962, he was Deputy Inspector-General of Police, CID and lead the counter-coup operation and subsequent investigation to arrest those involved. In April 1963, S. A. Dissanayake succeeded M. Walter F. Abeykoon as IGP. In early 1966, Dissanayake was placed on compulsory leave and was succeeded by John Attygalle as IGP.

Later work
Prime Minister Sirima Bandaranaike appointed Dissanayake as Additional Secretary to the Ministry of External Affairs and Defence in April 1971 when the 1971 JVP Insurrection broke out to  coordinated military and police operations.

Family
He was the younger brother of Cyril Dissanayake and his children were Dr Sriani Basanayake, sprinter Dr Nirmala LaBrooy and Surgeon Commodore Lakdasa Dissanayake.

External links and references
Coup of 1962: an inside story, by former diplomat T. D. S. A. Dissanayaka, son of C.C. "Jungle" Dissanayaka
Looking back on operation `Holdfast'
THE QUEEN v. CYRIL CYRUS DISSANAYAKA
JR’s Kandy March and the tale of ‘Imbulgoda Veeraya’ 
How tough cops got over tricky situations, Former DIG Vamadevan recalls police life in old Ceylon
How to correct the many wrongs in the police

Specific

Sri Lankan Inspectors General of Police
Sri Lankan Christians
Alumni of St. John's College, Nugegoda
Alumni of Royal College, Colombo
Alumni of the University of Ceylon
Alumni of the Ceylon University College
1982 deaths
People from British Ceylon
1913 births